Beijing Evening News or Beijing Wanbao, also known as Beijing Evening Post, is a Chinese language tabloid newspaper in the People's Republic of China from Beijing. It was founded on March 15, 1958. Mao Zedong wrote the title for it in 1964.

Beijing Evening Post featured the best-selling novel Beijinger in New York by Glen Cao as a television series in 1991. In 2002, the newspaper was found to have lifted a fake article about the U.S. Congress' Supposed Move From Washington D.C. in protest of better facilities from The Onion.

References

Newspapers published in Beijing
Chinese-language newspapers (Simplified Chinese)
Publications established in 1958
Daily newspapers published in China